The Austrian football champions are the winners of the highest league of football in Austria. The championship has been contested through the Austrian Football Bundesliga since the 1974–75 season.

Rapid Wien and Austria Wien are the most successful clubs. They have won 32 and 24 titles, respectively, as of 2022.

History
From 1911 until 1923 the Austrian football championship was organized by the football association of Niederösterreich (Lower Austria) which was made up only of clubs from the nation's capital of Vienna. The championship was then taken over by the newly formed football association of Vienna (WFV, Wiener Fußball-Verband), which organized the first professional league in continental Europe in 1924–25.

In 1938 Austria was united with Germany in the Anschluss and the country's football competition became part of the German league structure as the Gauliga Ostmark. For the first time clubs from outside of Vienna were included in top-flight Austrian competition.

Austrian clubs took part in the German championship during this period. An "Austrian champion" would emerge from divisional play in the Gauliga Ostmark and then move on to the German national playoffs with other Gauliga winners. Austrian clubs enjoyed a considerable measure of success playing in Germany, making three national final appearances and two Tschammerspokal (predecessor of today's German Cup) appearances: Rapid Vienna won the national title in 1941, while First Vienna took the Tschammerspokal in 1943.

Austrian football was again independent after World War II and championship play was limited to Viennese clubs until 1948–49 when clubs from the rest of Austria were re-admitted. In 1965, Linzer ASK became the first team from outside the capital to claim the Austrian title, leading the way for clubs such as FC Wacker Innsbruck, VÖEST Linz, SV Austria Salzburg, Sturm Graz, and Grazer AK.

List of Austrian national football champions

Performance

Performance by club

Notes:
  All teams are defunct clubs from Innsbruck, Tirol. Wacker Innsbruck (1915–1999), Swarovski Tirol (1986–1992) and Tirol Innsbruck (1993–2002). They are considered to be the continuation of each other.
  The Red Bull company bought the club on 6 April 2005 and rebranded it. Prior to 2005 the team was known as SV Austria Salzburg or Casino Salzburg. They also changed the colours from white-violet to red-white. The Violet-Whites ultimately formed a new club, SV Austria Salzburg.
 * FC Admira Wacker Mödling was formed after the merger of SK Admira Wien and SC Wacker Wien in 1971, under the name of Admira Wacker Wien, the merger with VfB Mödling in 1997 and the merger with SK Schwadorf in 2008. The new team plays in Mödling.

Name changes
Austria Wien was known as SV Amateure until 1926. From 1973–74 season, Wiener AC formed a joint team with FK Austria Wien, which was called FK Austria WAC Wien until 1976–77 season when Austria Wien decided to revert to their own club's traditional name. The results of the joint team are part of the Austria Wien football history.
SK Admira Wien and SC Wacker Wien merged in 1971 to form FC Admira Wacker Wien and played in the Südstadt Stadium at Maria Enzersdorf in Lower Austria. A subsequent merger with VfB Mödling in 1997 saw the club renamed VfB Admira Wacker Mödling.
Wacker Innsbruck changed names frequently and was also briefly united with WSG Wattens. Successor side Tirol Innsbruck folded in 2002.
SV Austria Salzburg was renamed FC Red Bull Salzburg after being purchased and re-made by energy drink maker Red Bull in April 2005. A new side using the original name SV Austria Salzburg was established by SV fans the same year and after winning 5 championships, from level 7, now they play in the Austrian Football First League, one league lower than Austrian Football Bundesliga.

See also
Austrian Football First League
Austrian Cup
Austrian Supercup

References

 
Austria